Steven Bouquet (5 January 1967 – 6 January 2022), also known as the Brighton Cat Killer, was a British criminal who was sentenced to five-years and three-months in prison for killing nine cats, maiming seven more, possession of a knife in a public place and failing to answer bail.  These attacks occurred in Brighton, East Sussex, England from October 2018 to June 2019.

Background
During the time period of the incidents, Bouquet was employed as a security guard at a shopping centre in Brighton.  Bouquet was a military veteran, having served for twenty-two years as a warrant officer in the Royal Navy, stationed in Northern Ireland and Iraq.

Hendrix attack
Mr. Levy, the owner of a previously killed cat had setup a closed-circuit television (CCTV) outside in the narrow alley connecting Church Street and North Road in Brighton to monitor the area.  On  31 May 2019, the CCTV  system captured Steven Bouquet bending over to stroke a nine-month old kitten named Hendrix, then removing a knife from his rucksack and stabbing Hendrix, who fled to their owners home. Stewart Montgomery, the owner of Hendrix found him bleeding profusely and took him to a vet, but Hendrix died from the wounds. The Sussex Police advised that the CCTV video was the evidence required to identify Bouquet as the Brighton Cat Killer.

Arrest and criminal charges
On 2 June 2019, just two days after the Hendrix incident, Mr. Levy saw Bouquet in the area again on his live CCTV, and contacted the Sussex Police. Bouquet was promptly arrested; he was carrying a Leatherman multi-tool.

During police questioning Brighton denied harming any cats, stating that "I'm no threat to animals [...] I have no issues with cats, dogs or anything like that".

The Sussex Police obtained a search warrant for Bouquet's home on Rose Hill Terrace and for his cellphone. The cellphone contained several images of the cats he had attacked, both alive and dead. In addition, the cellphone data placed Bouquet at or near the scene of the cat attacks at almost the same time.  A knife was found in the kitchen with a residue of cat's blood on the blade and Bouquet's DNA on the handle.

The Sussex Police were able to obtain enough evidence to charge Bouquet with killings of nine cats by stabbing them with a knife; the dead cats were named: Nancy, Ollie, Alan, Tommy, Cosmo, Hendrix, Hannah, Kyo and Gizmo.  In addition, Bouquet injured another seven cats with knife stab wounds named: Wheatley, Alistair, Rigby, Gideon, Samson, Jasper and Maggie. These sixteen incidents occurred in Brighton, East Sussex, between October 2018 and June 2019.

The authorities believe that Bouquet may have been responsible for over thirty cat attacks in Brighton.

The Sussex Police laid sixteen charges of criminal damage as English law deems cats to be property.  In addition, one charge of possession of a knife in a public place was laid.

Trial
On 22 June 2021, at the Chichester Crown Court the criminal trial by jury with Judge Jeremy Gold QC presiding was held. Bouquet failed to appear for the court hearing and was tried in absentia. Jurors at the trial heard numerous shocked owners found their cats bleeding and dying on their doorsteps.  The Crown Prosecutor advised the jury of the sixteen cat attacks, as follows:

Bouquet was convicted of all sixteen counts of criminal damage and possession of a knife in a public place.

Failing to answer bail
Bouquet failed to answer bail. The Sussex Police eventually located and apprehended Bouquet based on a tip from a member of the public that observed him drinking alcohol and displaying odd behaviour at a park in Brighton.

Sentencing
On 12 July 2021, judge Jeremy Gold QC presided over the sentencing hearing at Hove Crown Court.

Bouquet's lawyer advised the Court that Bouquet had served in the Royal Navy for twenty-two years and might suffer from post-traumatic stress disorder. In addition, the Court was advised that Bouquet had been diagnosed with thyroid cancer, which had spread to his liver and lungs.

The judge stated that Bouquet's behaviour was "cruel, it was sustained and it struck at the very heart of family life. It is important that everyone understands that cats are domestic pets but they are more than that. They are effectively family members. They are much loved by the adults and children who live with and care for them. Cats and all domestic animals are a source of joy and support to their owners, especially during [COVID-19] lockdown."

He sentenced Bouquet to five years for criminal damage, i.e., the cat killings, three months for possession of a knife in a public place to be served concurrently and three months for failing to answer bail to be served consecutively: an aggregate prison sentence to be served of five-years and three-months. Judge Gold stated that these criminal actions were "appalling"; the impact on the owners and their families was "considerable and grave"; and "no explanation for your [Bouquet] behaviour has been put forward but no sensible explanation could be advanced".

Death
The Prison Service said that Steven Bouquet died at the Medway Maritime Hospital on 6 January 2022.  Bouquets' cause of death was not announced; however, at the sentencing hearing the court was told that Bouquet had been diagnosed with thyroid cancer, which had metastasized to his liver and lungs.

Documentary
On 8 June 2022, the first broadcast of the ITV documentary "How to Catch a Cat Killer" was broadcast.  A spokesperson for Sussex Police stated that "An ITV documentary highlighting the successful Sussex Police investigation into the death of nine cats in Brighton will be aired this week. The ITV documentary will follow the complex and thorough investigation from the first reports being received in late 2018 through to sentencing in September 2021. It will show the breakthrough moment in May 2019 when CCTV captured Bouquet stabbing nine-month-old Hendrix in a passageway in Brighton, and his subsequent police interviews following arrest."

After the ITV documentary was aired, some viewers felt upset and disturbed, believing the documentary should not have been broadcast.

See also
 Ailurophobia, excessive fear or hate of cats.
 Croydon Cat Killer
 Human interaction with cats

References

1967 births
2018 in England
2019 in England
2022 deaths
Animal cruelty incidents
Cats in England
Crime in Brighton and Hove
Criminals from Sussex
English male criminals
English people who died in prison custody
Felids and humans
History of East Sussex
People from Brighton
Prisoners and detainees of England and Wales
Prisoners who died in England and Wales detention